Adré Airport  is a public use airport located near Adré, Ouaddaï, Chad.

See also
List of airports in Chad

References

External links 
 Airport record for Adré Airport at Landings.com

Airports in Chad
Ouaddaï Region